The Railroad Adventures of Chen Sing is a chapter book for young readers written by George Chiang and illustrated by Jessica Warner.  The book was published in hardcover, paperback and ebook on March 1, 2017 and has won the Pacific Book Award, The Reader Views Reviewer's Choice Award and two Global Ebook Awards.

Origins
The book is a work of historical fiction inspired by stories that Isaac (Ike) Sing told to Chiang in the late 1990s. Chiang made two trips, totalling a period of three weeks, to Sing's home in Cawston, British Columbia and recorded many hours of  interviews about his own life and the life of his father, Chen Sing. From these recordings Chiang put together the life story of Chen Sing and used it to write the book. The real Chen Sing was born in 1860 and was orphaned at a young age.
He lived an impoverished existence in Yin Ping, Guangdong with his elder brother and sister until his teenage years when he left to go to the city of Guangzhou, China to find work. Once there he found out about an opportunity to help build a railway in North America. The book follows his journey from his home village to the end of his railroad building days.

Plot
"While the book is a work of historical fiction, it is based on the life of a real Chen Sing, an orphan who emigrated from southern China in the wake of floods and famine. In the book, he is small but strong and is able to survive the arduous two-month sea voyage and succeed at various jobs with the railway crew that others can not handle because of his determination and intelligence. He is also helped by his friendship with members of the Coast Salish people, who help him acclimate to the surprisingly cold winter. One chapter extols the simple joys of ice fishing, snowshoeing, snowball fights, and other winter pastimes that Chen Sing enjoys for the first time with a new friend." Chen Sing and his railroad crew face disasters, encounters with wild animals and unforeseen events mark their journey as they build the railway through the Rocky Mountains until the completion of the railway.

Awards

2018 Pinnacle Book Achievement Award - Best Children's Book (Fiction) 

2017-18 Reader View Kids - Winner Canada West 

2017 Pacific Book Award - Best Children's Picture Book

2017 Global Ebook Award - Gold - Children's Literature Fiction 

2017 Global EBook Award - Gold - Juvenile Fiction

References

Canadian children's books
Canadian Pacific Railway